Stuart Ray Bell (born 1957) is an American academic. He was named the 29th president of The University of Alabama, located in Tuscaloosa, Alabama, on July 15, 2015.

Early life
Stuart R. Bell was born in Abilene, Texas in 1957. He graduated from Texas A&M University in College Station, Texas, where he received a Bachelor of Science degree in Nuclear Engineering in 1979. He received his master's and doctorate degrees in mechanical engineering from Texas A&M in 1981 and 1986, respectively.

Career
A 30-year veteran of higher education, Bell started his career as an assistant senior engineer for Mobil Research and Development Corp. in Dallas. First joining The University of Alabama in 1986 as an assistant professor in the College of Engineering's department of mechanical engineering, Bell was named department head nine years later. With research interest in combustion engines, Bell has expertise in alternative fuels for engines, innovative engine designs and modeling of engine and engine processes. He directed UA's Center for Advanced Vehicle Technologies from 1998 to 2002. Immediately prior to becoming UA's president, Bell was executive vice president and provost at Louisiana State University. During Bell's tenure there and earlier at the University of Kansas, where he served as dean of its College of Engineering, those institutions opened new facilities, and student recruitment, retention and success were emphasized. Bell was awarded the Society of Automotive Engineers' Ralph Teetor Award for Outstanding Contributions to Research and Teaching in 1988. He was presented the T. Morris Hackney Faculty Leadership Award for the UA College of Engineering in 2001, and, in 2005, he received the Richard S. Woodbury Award from the American Society of Mechanical Engineers.

Personal life
He is married to Susan Bell. They have two sons, Stuart and Stephen, and a daughter, Stacy.

References

External links

Living people
People from Abilene, Texas
Texas A&M University alumni
University of Alabama faculty
Louisiana State University faculty
University of Kansas faculty
Presidents of the University of Alabama
Date of birth missing (living people)
1951 births